Impact Records was an American record label founded in 1989 by Carl Sturken and Evan Rogers. It was once a subsidiary of MCA Records. Today, its back catalog remains part of Universal Music Group.

Acts on the label are and/or have included: Sass Jordan, The Fixx, Rythm Syndicate, Joey Lawrence, and Southside Johnny and the Asbury Jukes.

See also
 List of record labels

References

Defunct record labels of the United States
Rock record labels
MCA Records